Pelophryne lighti is a species of toad in the family Bufonidae.

Habitat
It is endemic to the Philippines in the provinces of Bohol, Samar, Leyte and Mindanao. Its natural habitats are subtropical or tropical moist lowland forests, subtropical or tropical moist montane forests, rivers, intermittent rivers, freshwater springs, and heavily degraded former forest.  It is threatened by habitat loss.

References

Pelophryne
Amphibians of the Philippines
Endemic fauna of the Philippines
Fauna of Bohol
Fauna of Samar
Fauna of Leyte
Fauna of Mindanao
Amphibians described in 1920
Taxonomy articles created by Polbot